Piotr Suski (born 29 June 1942 in Poland; died 31 January 2009 in Poland) was a Polish footballer who last played for Oulun Työväen Palloilijat in Finland.

Career

Suski started his senior career with ŁKS Łódź in the Polish Ekstraklasa, where he made over ninety appearances and scored nine goals. After that, he played for Waterford and Oulun Työväen Palloilijat.

References

External links 
 Poles apart: Piotr Suski, Włodzimierz Lubański and the League of Ireland
 LOI INERNATIONALS: PIOTR SUSKI
 Legendary footballers ŁKS Jerzy Sadek and Piotr Suski cheered on their successors
 Poland 1: 4 Match France
 Historia Polskiej Piłki Nożnej Profile

1942 births
2009 deaths
Place of birth missing
Expatriate association footballers in the Republic of Ireland
ŁKS Łódź players
Waterford F.C. players
Polish expatriate sportspeople in Finland
Polish expatriate sportspeople in Ireland
Expatriate footballers in Finland
Polish footballers
Poland international footballers
Polish expatriate footballers
Association football midfielders
Oulun Työväen Palloilijat players